Onésimo Cepeda Silva (25 March 1937 – 31 January 2022) was a Mexican Roman Catholic prelate.

He was bishop of Ecatepec from 1995 to 2012. 

He died from complications of COVID-19 in Mexico City on 31 January 2022, at the age of 84.

References

1937 births
2022 deaths
Bishops appointed by Pope John Paul II
Deaths from the COVID-19 pandemic in Mexico
Mexican Roman Catholic bishops
People from Ecatepec de Morelos